Padcaya is a town in the Tarija Department in southeastern Bolivia.

Padcaya is the administrative center of Aniceto Arce Province. It is situated 1,997 m above sea level on the banks of Río Orosas, 50 km south of Tarija, the department capital. Northwest of Padcaya, towards Río Camacho, the town is bordered by a mountain range of 20 km length, Cerro Guancani (2,960 m) being its highest summit.

Padcaya is crossed by the road from Tarija to Bermejo, border town to Argentina in the southern parts of the department.

Padcaya has a population of circa 1,500.

Populated places in Tarija Department